Lacordairia is a genus of beetles in the family Carabidae, containing the following species:

 Lacordairia anchomenoides Castelnau, 1867
 Lacordairia angustata Castelnau, 1867
 Lacordairia argutoroides Castelnau, 1867
 Lacordairia calathoides Castelnau, 1867
 Lacordairia cychroides Castelnau, 1867
 Lacordairia erichsoni Castelnau, 1867
 Lacordairia fugax (Olliff, 1889) 
 Lacordairia insulicola Moore, 1985 
 Lacordairia proxima Castelnau, 1867
 Lacordairia terrena Olliff, 1885

References

Licininae
Taxa named by François-Louis Laporte, comte de Castelnau